Ante Pavić was the defending champion but chose not to defend his title.

Michael Mmoh won the title after defeating Jordan Thompson 6–3, 7–6(7–4) in the final.

Seeds

Draw

Finals

Top half

Bottom half

References
Main Draw
Qualifying Draw

Columbus Challenger - Singles
Columbus Challenger